Grof, Gróf may refer to:

People:
 Andrew Grove
 Bela "Bert" Grof (1921-2011), an Australian forage researcher of Hungarian origin 
 Gróf András István (born 1936), a Hungarian-American businessman and scientist
 Dávid Gróf (born 1989), a Hungarian association footballer
 Jonas Grof (born 1996), a German basketball player
 Ödön Gróf (1915 – 1997), a Hungarian swimmer who competed in the 1936 Summer Olympics
 Paul Grof, a psychiatrist and member of the World Health Organization committee that evaluated ecstasy
 Stanislav Grof (born 1931), a Czech psychiatrist

Other:
 Grossflammenwerfer, a nickname for a German flamethrower of the First World War

See also 
 Groff (disambiguation)
 Graf (disambiguation)
 Graff (disambiguation)